Tremont Avenue is a street in the Bronx, New York City. Its west end is at Sedgwick Avenue in Morris Heights, and its east end is at Schurz Avenue in Throggs Neck, running almost the entire width of the Bronx. Around 2009, part of East Tremont Avenue renamed to Hector Lavoe Avenue, in honor of the late salsa musician.

Transportation
The following New York City Subway stations serve Tremont Avenue:
 Tremont Avenue at Grand Concourse
 West Farms Square–East Tremont Avenue at Boston Road
 Westchester Square–East Tremont Avenue at Westchester Avenue

MTA Regional Bus Operations operates several local bus routes along Tremont Avenue. The majority of East Tremont Avenue east of Webster Avenue is served by the  bus routes. The segment between Webster and University Avenues is served by the Bx36 bus, and the segment west of University Avenue is served by the Bx18 bus. Short segments of Tremont Avenue are also used by other bus routes.

References

Streets in the Bronx